James Alexander Hogue (2 September 1846 – 2 August 1920) was an Australian journalist and politician.

He was born at Clarence Town to miller Fitzarthur Hogue and Elizabeth McKay. He attended Newcastle Church of England Grammar School and was briefly a pupil teacher before becoming a compositor, then taking a job as a parliamentary reporter in 1875. On 17 April 1878 he married Jessie Robards at Clarence Town; they would have ten children.

In 1894 he was elected to the New South Wales Legislative Assembly as the Free Trade member for Glebe. In 1898 he was appointed Minister of Public Instruction and Minister for Labour and Industry, serving until 1899. He was Colonial Secretary from 1904 to 1907 and Minister of Public Instruction from 1907 to 1910, when he lost his seat.

Hogue died at Mosman in 1920 and was buried at Waverley Cemetery.

Hogue Place, in the Canberra suburb of Gilmore, is named in his and his son Oliver Hogue's honour.

References

 

1846 births
1920 deaths
Free Trade Party politicians
Members of the New South Wales Legislative Assembly
Australian journalists